Lepistella is a genus of fungus in the family Tricholomataceae. It is a monotypic genus, containing the single species Lepistella ocula, found in Central America and reported as new to science in 2007.

See also

 List of Tricholomataceae genera

References

External links
 

Tricholomataceae
Monotypic Agaricales genera
Fungi of Central America
Taxa described in 2007